Scopula seras is a moth of the  family Geometridae. It is found on Timor.

References

Moths described in 1938
seras
Moths of Asia